The 1932 Brooklyn Dodgers season was the first season the franchise was officially known as the Dodgers, with the name making its first appearance on some of the team's jerseys. The Dodgers nickname had in use since the 1890s and was used interchangeably with other nicknames in media reports, particularly "Robins" in reference to longtime manager Wilbert Robinson. With Robinson's retirement after the 1931 season and the arrival of Max Carey, the nickname "Robins" was no longer used. The team wound up finishing the season in third place.

Offseason 
 January 23, 1932: Bob Parham (minors) and cash were traded by the Dodgers to the St. Louis Cardinals for Hack Wilson.
 March 14, 1932: Babe Herman, Wally Gilbert and Ernie Lombardi were traded by the Robins to the Cincinnati Reds for Tony Cuccinello, Joe Stripp and Clyde Sukeforth.

Regular season

Season standings

Record vs. opponents

Notable transactions 
 May 7, 1932: Danny Taylor was purchased by the Dodgers from the Chicago Cubs.

Roster

Player stats

Batting

Starters by position 
Note: Pos = Position; G = Games played; AB = At bats; H = Hits; Avg. = Batting average; HR = Home runs; RBI = Runs batted in

Other batters 
Note: G = Games played; AB = At bats; H = Hits; Avg. = Batting average; HR = Home runs; RBI = Runs batted in

Pitching

Starting pitchers 
Note: G = Games pitched; IP = Innings pitched; W = Wins; L = Losses; ERA = Earned run average; SO = Strikeouts

Other pitchers 
Note: G = Games pitched; IP = Innings pitched; W = Wins; L = Losses; ERA = Earned run average; SO = Strikeouts

Relief pitchers 
Note: G = Games pitched; W = Wins; L = Losses; SV = Saves; ERA = Earned run average; SO = Strikeouts

Awards and honors 
TSN Major League All-Star Team
Lefty O'Doul

Farm system

Notes

References 
Baseball-Reference season page
Baseball Almanac season page

External links 
1932 Brooklyn Dodgers uniform
Brooklyn Dodgers reference site
Acme Dodgers page 
Retrosheet

Los Angeles Dodgers seasons
Brooklyn Dodgers
Brooklyn
1930s in Brooklyn
Flatbush, Brooklyn